Prunus integrifolia is a tree native to mountain forests of western South America. The flowers are in an elongated raceme, rising vertically upwards rather than hanging as in some other species.

References

External links 

Photo of living specimen at Madidi National Park in Bolivia

integrifolia
Plants described in 1851
Flora of South America
Trees of Peru
Trees of Colombia
Trees of Ecuador
Trees of Bolivia
Trees of Venezuela